Kaplan Street is a major thoroughfare in central Tel Aviv, Israel, running from the Azrieli Center interchange on its eastern edge, to Ibn Gabirol Street on its western edge.

History
Named after Eliezer Kaplan, an important Israeli politician, the street connects the city center to the Ayalon Highway, and is one of the busiest streets in the city. Right next to it, lies the old Templer neighborhood of Sarona, which has undergone a major renovation programme, in addition to the street itself, which has been widened in recent years.

The Israeli Intelligence Community had offices on this street.

See also
 Streets in Tel Aviv

References

External links
 Kaplan Street renovation project at the Ayalon Highway website

Streets in Tel Aviv